Ounga, also known as Younga and Jounga, is an archaeological site on the Mediterranean coast of Tunisia, located  south of Sfax along the Mediterranean coast. The area is also known for its oil fields.

History
Ounga was a Phoenician and Carthaginian colony under the name  ("New Place"). The coastal town was the intersection of the road from Carthage to Tacape and the road branching off to Sufetula.

After the Punic Wars, the area fell under Roman control. The name was latinized to Macomades.

The name of the city changed in the 4th century. In ancient times, Ounga was the site of Christian activity that produced various religious buildings. Accordingly, it maintained relations with other cities such as Carthage. Historians, such as Tunisian archaeologist Zainab Benzina, state that a representative of the city of Younga, the bishop Valentinianus, attended the Council of Carthage (412). In addition, the city hosted a provincial council in 524.

Remains of the Roman town include three Byzantine basilicas, city ramparts, a citadel, a vaulted cistern and crypts. Some of the remains show Coptic influence.

The citadel was identified in 1944 by French archaeologist Louis Poinsot as the place described by Arab geographers Al Bakri and Al-Idrissi under the name of Kasr er-Roum (Castle of the Romans). It was transformed in the 9th century by the Aghlabids, who modified the upper part of the walls. Poinssot identifies Younga as the new name of the city of Macomades Minores, also called Macomades Lunci or Lunca. The discovery in 1936 of a fragment of a milestone from the mid-3rd century close to Younga definitively confirmed the relationship.

Bishopric
Ounga was the seat of an ancient Latin Catholic diocese, about which little is known.

A synod took place on the site after the Muslim conquest of the Maghreb and another in 523 AD. A Christian monastery was founded in the town around 500 AD. Two bishops are known:
Verecundus of Iunca  
Valentinianus, who attended the Council of Carthage (412), as above

The bishopric survives today as a titular bishopric, which has been vacant since the departure of the last bishop, Marcel Roger Buyse, in 2008.

Fortress

The remains of the Byzantine fort known as Bordj Younga are noted for their excellent condition.

References

Citations

Bibliography

 .
 .

Populated places in Tunisia
Archaeology of Tunisia
Catholic titular sees in Africa
Phoenician colonies in Tunisia